is a non-denominational private university located in Mitaka, Tokyo, Japan, commonly known as ICU. With the efforts of Prince Takamatsu, General Douglas MacArthur, and BOJ President Hisato Ichimada, ICU was established in 1949 as the first liberal arts college in Japan. Currently the university offers 31 undergraduate majors and a graduate school. The Ministry of Education, Culture, Sports, Science and Technology selected ICU as one of the 37 schools for The Top Global University Project in 2014.

ICU is unique for being a fully bilingual campus, the classes are held in either English or Japanese, with all faculty required to have strong command in both languages. The university named by Forbes as a top 10 liberal arts college in Asia and ranks as the best Japanese private university  by 2020 Times Higher Education Japan University Rankings. Its notable alumni include Princess Mako of Akishino, Princess Kako of Akishino, President and CEO of Sony, Kaz Hirai, and U.S. Senator, Jay Rockefeller.

ICU is a member of the Alliance of Asian Liberal Arts Universities and it has several partner institutions worldwide such as The University of California system, University of Pennsylvania, Duke University, Georgetown University, Yonsei University, University College London, London School of Economics and Political Science, University of British Columbia and more.

Institution

History
ICU was founded in 1949. With an emphasis on reconciliation and peace, ICU was envisaged as a "University of Tomorrow", a place where Japanese and international students would live together and learn to serve the needs of an emerging, more interconnected world. When students enter ICU they sign the United Nations Universal Declaration of Human Rights and they are challenged to commit themselves to help bring about social justice and world peace. Due to this commitment to human rights, Eleanor Roosevelt delivered ICU's first convocation address.

According to JICUF (Japan ICU Foundation), 
Concerted fundraising campaigns were initiated in both Japan and in North America. Hisato Ichimada, the Governor of the Bank of Japan who was Buddhist, headed the Japan campaign that raised the funds necessary to purchase a large tract of land for the university. The Honorary Chair of the US fundraising campaign was General Douglas MacArthur, and the North American public responded with generous contributions as well.

The third son of the Emperor Taishō, a younger brother of the Emperor Shōwa and an uncle of the Emperor Akihito Nobuhito, Prince Takamatsu officiated the Honorary President of the Preparatory Committee for founding ICU.

Campus
ICU's main campus of 150 wooded acres is located in Western Tokyo, with downtown areas like Shinjuku about half an hour's train ride away. Computer and internet access is available throughout the campus.

The campus sits on ancient pre-Jomon and Jomon archaeological remains, which gives students the opportunity to participate in archaeological fieldwork. Excavated items found on the campus are on permanent display in the Hachiro Yuasa Memorial Museum. In addition, the campus is directly on the former location of a Nakajima Aircraft Company factory.

In a quiet wooded area of the campus and through a large thatched gate is the Taizanso Garden. Built in the 1920s, the garden includes a traditional Japanese tea house and the historically significant One-Mat Room constructed out of wood gathered from sacred and historic sites throughout Japan.

ICU owns a  campus in Nasu and a  retreat center in Karuizawa, Kitasaku District, Nagano Prefecture.

ICU houses a Rotary Center for peace and conflict resolution, partnering with Rotary International. It is the only Rotary Peace Center giving graduate degrees in Asia and is only one of seven Peace Centers worldwide. The University of California Tokyo Study Center which hosts the UCEAP program to Japan is also located on ICU campus.

Academics

ICU offers bachelor's degrees in liberal arts fields, as well as master's and doctoral degrees in education, public administration, comparative culture and the natural sciences. About 18% of the faculty come from overseas (primarily English-speaking countries). There is a strong English language program (ELP), taught by tenured and contract faculty English teachers, which was embroiled in a contentious curricular reform in 2010 leading to the name being changed to the ELA (English for Liberal Arts program) in April 2012. Academics who aspire to teach at ICU are required to submit a reference who can testify to their commitment to Christianity, despite the university' stance that increasing adherents to the Christian faith, it is not its primary goal.

Undergraduate programs 

Students choose one or two majors as single major, double major or major/minor. Over 30 majors are being offered as of 2022.

 American Studies
 Anthropology
 Arts and Archaeology
 Asian Studies
 Biology
 Business
 Chemistry
 Computer Science
 Development Studies
 Economics
 Education
 Environmental Studies
 Gender and Sexuality Studies
 Global Studies
 International Relations
 Japan Studies
 Language Education
 Law
 Linguistics
 Literature
 Mathematics
 Media, Communication and Culture
 Music
 Peace Studies
 Philosophy and Religion
 Physics
 Politics
 Psychology
 Public Policy
 Sociology

Graduate programs
Graduate programs at the university include:

 Master of Arts in Education
 Concentrations: Education, Psychology, or Language Education
 Master of Arts in Public Administration or Master of Arts in International Relations
 Master of Arts in Social and Cultural Analysis
 Master of Arts in Media and Language
 Master of Arts in Public Economics
 Master of Arts in Peace Studies
 Master of Arts in Comparative Culture
 Concentrations: Japanese Culture Studies or Transcultural Studies
 Master of Arts in Natural Sciences
 Concentrations: Mathematics and Information Science, Material Science, or Life Science

Bilingual academics 
The languages of instruction at ICU are Japanese and English. Around 30% of all courses are offered in English, the rest in Japanese or in both languages.

Prospective students without prior Japanese language knowledge are able to apply under a documentary screening process, instead of undergoing the entrance exams held in Japanese. These students are required to have college level English proficiency and subsequently take ICU Japanese Language Programs (JLP) courses to gain bilingualism and eventually take courses taught in Japanese.

Under the policy of bilingualism of ICU curriculum, students take language courses for their non-dominant language in their freshman and sophomore year (Depending on the student's language requirements, English for Liberal Arts or Japanese Language Programs).

Each campus department staffs employees with strong command in both languages. Student resources, ICU websites, and campus bulletin boards are in both Japanese and English to accommodate students from any language background.

Trimester system 
The academic year is divided into trimesters of approximately eleven weeks each with each course lasting one trimester term. This allows for a dynamic learning experience, one where students can design their own curricula as their interests change and develop.

Japan ICU Foundation
The Japan ICU Foundation (JICUF) was incorporated in New York State on November 23, 1948, and helped to establish ICU in 1953. Today, the foundation maintains two non-profit corporations: The Japan ICU Foundation, Inc. and the JICUF Endowment, Inc.

The Japan ICU Foundation supports ICU in a variety of ways, including providing scholarships, running a faculty exchange program, providing funding for international programs and projects and helping to fund new buildings on campus. The Foundation has offices in New York City. The current Executive Director of JICUF is Paul Hastings.

Research institutes 
ICU has eight research institutes as of 2016. In addition to research, these institutes plan and sponsor conferences, lectures, symposia and seminars as well as provide students with opportunities to meet distinguished scholars from Japan and overseas.
 The Institute of Educational Research and Service (IERS)
 The Social Science Research Institute (SSRI)
 The Institute for the Study of Christianity and Culture (ICC)
 The Institute of Asian Cultural Studies (IACS)
 The Peace Research Institute (PRI)
 The Research Center for Japanese Language Education (RCJLE)
 The Institute for Advanced Studies of Clinical Psychology (IASCP)
 The Center for Gender Studies (CGS)

Student life

Demographics
As of 2011, ICU had 2851 undergraduates studying in the College of Liberal Arts, with 1041 male students and 1810 female students. The ICU Graduate School had 150 students, with 64 men and 86 women. 90.5% of ICU's undergraduate and graduate students are Japanese citizens, and the remainder represent 44 countries. Many returnee Japanese students that have lived overseas, also known as kikokushijo (帰国子女), make up the student body.

The majority of ICU students live off-campus, either at home with their families or in apartments. As of 2010, about 600 students were living on campus.

International Education Exchange Programs 
More than half of the students participate in study abroad programs during their time at ICU. The percentage of students who study abroad through ICU programs before they graduate is 55.5% (in 2014). Students who come from abroad to study at ICU on a year-long exchange program are referred to as OYRs (One Year Regulars).

ICU Dining Hall
Rebuilt in 2010, Gakki is a public, self-service cafeteria and is one of the newest buildings on campus.

Student clubs/circles
ICU students are known for their remarkable energy and initiative in creating a kaleidoscope of student-led and student-managed co-curricular activities. There are about 100 student-led clubs and organizations in the arts, sports, academic and social fields. New clubs are formed as student interest dictates, and most ICU students participate in one or more of these organizations.

After graduation 
As of 2016, 95.3% of ICU undergraduate alumni (students seeking employment) land a job right after graduation.  ICU students have found employment in a wide range of industries, particularly with global companies.

Over 20% of students go on to graduate school overseas and in Japan. Domestic and Overseas Universities include: International Christian University, University of Tokyo, Kyoto University, Hitotsubashi University, University of Oxford, Columbia University, Massachusetts Institute of Technology, University of London, and Harvard University.

Accreditation
Accreditation actions had been taken at the American Academy for Liberal Education Board of Trustees Meeting at November 2005.
 International Christian University, Tokyo, Japan – granted Programmatic Accreditation, through November 2015

ICU's academic programs of the College of Liberal Arts and the Graduate School are individually chartered by the Japanese Ministry of Education, Culture, Sports, Science and Technology (MEXT). ICU has also received accreditation from the Japan University Accreditation Association (JUAA).

Academic rankings

There are several rankings related to ICU, shown below.

General rankings
In 2019, ICU was ranked 11th among all universities in Japan, and 1st among private universities by Times Higher Education and Benesse. QS World University Rankings ranked ICU as 174th in Asia in 2016. Forbes made a list of top 10 liberal arts colleges in Asia including ICU that was based on the 2014 QS University rankings for Asia.

Alumni rankings
According to the Weekly Economist'''s 2010 rankings and the  article on 2006/10/16, graduates from ICU have the 24th best employment rate in 400 major companies, and their average graduate salary is the 4th best in Japan.

Popularity and selectivity
ICU is one of the most selective universities in Japan. Its entrance difficulty is usually considered one of the top among 730 private universities. National and public universities use different kinds of exams. Thus it's only comparable between universities in the same category, e.g.,  published Hensachi (the indication showing the entrance difficulties by prep schools) rankings. Japanese journalist  ranks its entrance difficulty as SA (most selective/out of 11 scales) in Japan, which includes only four private universities and 11 national universities.

Notable alumni

See also List in Japanese version''

Kei Akagi – jazz pianist
Takeshi Amemiya – The Edward Ames Edmonds Professor of Economics at Stanford University
Toshio Arima – president of Fuji Xerox
Albert Chan (1975) – president of Hong Kong Baptist University
Cosei Kawa – illustrator of children's books
Shigeru Miyagawa – professor of Linguistics & Kochi-Manjiro professor of Japanese Language and Culture at Massachusetts Institute of Technology
Yoko Narahashi – prominent film producer and casting director
Mariko Peters – former Dutch politician and civil servant
Kazuko Yokoo – justice of the Supreme Court of Japan
Lydia Yu-Jose – Japanologist and professor at the Ateneo de Manila University
Nozomi Watanabe – Olympic ice dancer who regularly dances with Akiyuki Kido
Kaori Enjoji – business journalist
Kei Komuro – law clerk at Lowenstein Sandler, husband of former Japanese princess Mako Komuro

Faculty
Iwao Ayusawa, joined staff in 1952

See also

International Christian University High School

References

External links

  
ICU website 
ICU Science Faculty website (bilingual)
ICU Social Science Research Institute (bilingual)
English for Liberal Arts program website 
Japan ICU Foundation
ICU High School website 

 
Nondenominational Christian universities and colleges
Liberal arts colleges
Christian universities and colleges in Japan
Private universities and colleges in Japan
Educational institutions established in 1949
Association of Christian Universities and Colleges in Asia
1949 establishments in Japan
Mitaka, Tokyo